Iona is an unincorporated community in Lyman County, South Dakota, United States. Although not tracked by the Census Bureau, Iona has been assigned the ZIP code of 57542.

Iona is a Native American name meaning "fire around".

References

Unincorporated communities in Lyman County, South Dakota
Unincorporated communities in South Dakota